Beledanga  is a village in Chanditala II community development block of Srirampore subdivision in Hooghly district in the Indian state of West Bengal.

Geography
Chanditala police station serves this Village.

Gram panchayat
Villages and census towns in Barijhati gram panchayat are: Barijhati, Beledanga, Gokulpur, Khanpur, Makhalpara and Thero.

Demographics
As per 2011 Census of India, Beledanga had a total population of 3,777 of which 1,936 (51%) were males and 1,841 (49%) were females. Population below 6 years was 363. The total number of literates in Beledanga was 2,937 (86.03% of the population over 6 years).

Transport
The nearest railway station is at Gobra on the Howrah-Bardhaman chord line which is a part of the Kolkata Suburban Railway system.

References 

Villages in Chanditala II CD Block